Sheldon Arthur Patinkin (August 27, 1935 – September 21, 2014) was a chair of the Theater Department of Columbia College Chicago, Artistic Director of the Getz Theater of Columbia College, Artistic Consultant of The Second City and of Steppenwolf Theatre and Co-Director of the Steppenwolf Theatre Summer Ensemble Workshops.

He received a Jeff Award for directing his Irving Berlin revue Puttin’ on the Ritz and a special Jeff for his contribution to Chicago theater. His translation of Brecht's The Good Person of Setzuan was directed by Frank Galati at the Goodman Theatre.  He was a cousin of the actor and singer Mandy Patinkin.

Career
Born and raised in Chicago, Patinkin graduated from the University of Chicago with a degree in English. While there, he joined Playwright's Theater Club, where he put up plays with a group of other students including Mike Nichols, Elaine May, and Ed Asner. Patinkin was a member of The Second City Chicago in 1959, first serving at assistant director to Paul Sills and then succeeding him as artistic director from 1963 until 1968 eventually becoming Artistic Consultant. From 1968 until 1974, he lived in New York City working in theater, film, and writing. In 1974, he was asked by Bernard Sahlins to move to Toronto to help Second City in Toronto get off the ground. While there, he was a writer-assistant producer for SCTV (1976–78). He provided additional dialogue for an adaptation of an Isaac Bashevis Singer novel entitled The Magician of Lublin. In 1980, he became the Chair of the theater department at Columbia College Chicago, serving until 2009, but continued to teach and direct as Chair Emeritus until his death.  He was an artistic consultant to the Steppenwolf Theater Company and co-founded The School at Steppenwolf, where he taught for 17 years.

Among his directing projects outside of the college were The Glass Menagerie (Gift Theater Company), South Pacific (Metropolis Art Center), Uncle Vanya (Steppenwolf), Long Day's Journey into Night (Irish Rep and the Galway Festival in Ireland) and Krapp's Last Tape for the Buckets of Beckett Festival, both starring John Mahoney, and concert stagings of opera scenes and excerpts for the Lyric Opera Center at the Grant Park and Ravinia Festival Concerts. He had previously directed Mahoney along with John Malkovich and Terry Kinney in Death of a Salesman in 1980 for Steppenwolf.

His revue, Puttin' on the Ritz: an Irving Berlin American Songbook, won Joseph Jefferson Awards for Best Revue and Best Director. Additionally he has received a special Joseph Jefferson Award for Service to the Chicago Theater Community in 1991, and the Illinois Association's 1992 Outstanding Contribution Award.

In July 2014, Columbia College Chicago announced the Sheldon Patinkin Endowed Award, a scholarship named in his honor that will provide a theater student with a cash stipend to aid them with their career.

Books
Patinkin wrote Second City: Backstage at the World's Greatest Comedy Theater, published by Sourcebooks in 2000. His textbook on the history of the American Musical No Legs, No Jokes, No Chance was published by Northwestern University Press in 2008.

Death and legacy
On September 21, 2014, Patinkin died in Chicago after a heart attack, aged 79. He was buried two days later at Shalom Memorial Park in Arlington Heights, IL. He was survived by his brother Norman Patinkin, his sister Ida Patinkin Goldberger, and many nieces and nephews. At the time of his death, he was in the process of directing a production of "Into The Woods" at Columbia College Chicago, which opened one month later.

On January 26, 2015, four months after his death, a memorial service was held in Skokie, IL. Speakers at the event, that was put together by The Second City, Columbia College Chicago, and Steppenwolf Theater, included Scott Adsit, Second City executive producer Andrew Alexander, David Cromer, Columbia College faculty Tom Mula, Meg Thalken, and Caroline Latta, Gift Theater artistic director Michael Patrick Thornton, and Jeff Perry and with letters from Anna D. Shapiro, Joyce Piven, and Alan Arkin. The event was attended by over five generations of colleagues and former students, including Fred Willard, Susan Messing, Mick Napier, John Mahoney, Laurie Metcalf, Rondi Reed, Jim Jacobs, and Isabella Hofmann.

At the theater building at Columbia College Chicago, the New Studio Theater, which Patinkin used for many of the productions that he directed, has been named the Sheldon Patinkin Theater in his honor.

References

External links

1935 births
2014 deaths
Male actors from Chicago
Jewish American male actors
American people of Russian-Jewish descent
Columbia College Chicago faculty
Patinkin family
21st-century American Jews